Iron Man: Original Motion Picture Soundtrack is the soundtrack album to the 2008 film Iron Man, featuring music composed by Ramin Djawadi. The soundtrack was produced in collaboration with Hans Zimmer and Remote Control Productions, and was released on April 29, 2008, by Lions Gate Records.

Djawadi joined the film after John Debney, who previously collaborated with director Jon Favreau, was unavailable. The score focuses heavily on electric guitar, as requested by Favreau, and was recorded with a rock band as well a traditional orchestra. The soundtrack also includes the classic 1966 Iron Man theme song, and a big band-style arrangement of it by John O'Brien and Rick Boston, who also frequently collaborate with Favreau.

The soundtrack was negatively received by critics, especially the score's use of electric guitar and Remote Control influences. However, the inclusion of the classic theme, in its original and modern cover forms, was received positively, and the soundtrack was ultimately nominated at the 51st Grammy Awards.

Background

After Iron Man director Jon Favreau's previous collaborator John Debney was unavailable to score the film, Iron Man fan Ramin Djawadi sought out the role. Filming on Iron Man had already been completed by the time Djawadi joined the production, and rather than wait until he could see the completed film, as he usually would, Djawadi began "playing with ideas" as soon as he saw the first trailer. Due to time constraints and the final cut of the film changing until "the last possible minute", Djawadi had help with arrangements and additional cues from Hans Zimmer and Remote Control Productions.

Favreau requested Djawadi's score be more guitar and rock focused, with Djawadi's history playing guitar helping with this. Guitarist Aaron Kaplan performed most of the guitar for the score, with Rage Against the Machine guitarist Tom Morello, who makes a cameo appearance in the film, also contributing guitar performances. The rock band Djawadi used was recorded at Remote Control, while recording of a full orchestra took place at AIR Studios. The final score was mixed at Remote Control.

Musicians John O'Brien and Rick Boston, frequent collaborators with Favreau, provided a big band-style arrangement of the Iron Man theme song from the 1966 cartoon The Marvel Super Heroes. "Institutionalized", a song from band Suicidal Tendencies whose lead vocalist Mike Muir went to school with Iron Man star Robert Downey Jr., is also included on the soundtrack. Djawadi performed a piano rendition of Antonio Salieri's "Concerto in Do Maggiroe Per Pianoforte eo Orchestra: Larghetto" which was used exclusively for the film, and as such was not included in the soundtrack.

Track listing
All music by Ramin Djawadi, except where noted.

Release
The soundtrack was released by Lions Gate Records, who had a licensing deal with Marvel Entertainment, on April 29, 2008.

Reception

Critical response
Christian Clemmenson of Filmtracks.com was extremely critical of the Remote Control influences on the soundtrack, negatively comparing it to Steve Jablonsky's Transformers and scoring it one star out of five. He stated that there is "nothing inherently wrong" with an electric guitar-focused score, but Djawadi "is not yet ready to provide [the] level of intrigue" that other composers such as Debney and Danny Elfman were able to with the instrument. Clemmenson also questioned Djawadi's use of an orchestra, feeling that it gets "washed away in the mix so thoroughly that the rock band and a set of keyboards is all that was truly required for this music" Jonathon Broxton at Movie Music UK said that Djawadi's approach "seems to have been to appeal to the lowest of common denominators with driving rock rhythms, pseudo-heroic crescendos, and increasingly accelerating tempos. It’s the ultimate musical overkill – loud, fast, brash, devoid of any kind of depth, and failing entirely to comment on any nuances which may exist in the film". Broxton said, "it’s not even good rock music ... the guitars do little more than repeat themselves over and over again, and the synth overdubs simply add another layer of aural sludge."

Movie Wave's James Southall gave the soundtrack no stars, calling it "yet another phoned-in score" from Remote Control, "completely puerile garbage, as bad as film music gets". Conversely, Christopher Coleman, writing for Tracksounds, gave the score a six out of ten, saying, "as much as I had prepared myself to dislike this score...as much as I thought I'd be among the throngs of haters...and as much as I long for classically-styled scores for superhero films, Iron Man has won me over." He felt that fans of the Remote Control style would find the score an "industrially-clever diversion", but for others it would only give "more fuel for your personal, [Remote Control]-bond-fires". He felt that the release "captures the most of the significant cues", but suffers from the inclusion of Suicidal Tendencies' "Institutionalized". Coleman concluded by saying that "a traditional, all-symphonic score would not have worked better for this film". Allmusic gave the release three stars out of five, with reviewer James Christopher Monger saying that Djawadi "treats the superhero with a predictably heavy hand", and imbues the film with "enough bombast to fuel two sequels".

Many critics praised the inclusion of both the Urbont's classic 1966 Iron Man theme song and the modern cover of it, with Coleman calling it "one of the best surprises of the movie and score", and Broxton highlighting the cover as "a wonderful piece of feelgood jazz". Clemmenson lamented the theme not being integrated into Djawadi's music, feeling that it is "so diametrically opposed to the Remote Control handbook for simplistic progressions that it's disappointing that Djawadi didn't take a stab at coherently interpolating it into the new work."

Accolades

References

External links
Iron Man Soundtrack - Soundtrack.Net
Iron Man soundtrack - the SoundtrackInfo project

Marvel Cinematic Universe: Phase One soundtracks
Iron Man (film series)
2008 soundtrack albums
2000s film soundtrack albums
Lionsgate Records soundtracks
Ramin Djawadi soundtracks